Jason Fernandes is an Indian blockchain entrepreneur and technology columnist hailing from Goa. As a teenager, Fernandes founded the internet portal ZeoCities.com, the non-profit LDKids.org and wrote for CHIP Magazine. Later, while studying at the University of Texas, Austin, Fernandes co-invented the Internet-based DVR, InstantTV, and was part of the founding team at PerceptiveI (a company that developed ECRM software). After moving to Goa in 2012, Fernandes began working as a monthly technology columnist for GlobeAsia Magazine, Indonesia. He has also founded the IoT company SmartKlock Inc and two Blockchain companies, FUNL Corp, and Malta-based AET Ventures (AEToken), of which he is presently the COO. Fernandes has advised state governments and political parties on IT and education policies. He also writes for various technology media publications and has spoken at TEDx events.

Early life
Jason Fernandes was born in Bombay (now known as Mumbai) to artists Thomas and Jeanette Fernandes. Fernandes was a teenager when he was diagnosed with dyslexia. It was then that he was given access to the family computer, which started his journey into technology.

Career

Teenage years
In 1998, Fernandes bought his first website domain, www.jasonsoftware.com, which later became ZeoCities.com: a web portal offering free email, websites, search engine, news and chat. He also became a writer and technology troubleshooter for one of India’s most widely read computer publications, CHIP Magazine (christened Dr. Chip). In 1999, Fernandes created Learning Disabled Kids, a non-profit website, as a way of helping others better understand dyslexia, dysgraphia, dyscalculia, attention deficit disorder and other learning disabilities. For this, in 1999, he was awarded the Childnet International Award (UK).

College years
Fernandes moved to the United States to study at the University of Texas, Austin. While studying there, he was among the founding members of RecordTV.com (now known as InstantTV), where he holds a patent for a Network DVR; he also part of the founding team of PerceptiveI, a company that developed patented ECRM software for clients.

Return to India and subsequent career
After completing his education, Fernandes moved back to India, residing in Goa. He then started working as a technology columnist for Indonesia’s GlobeAsia Magazine. Over the years, his writings have appeared in The Jakarta Globe, CHIP, DNA India, The Goan and Man's World Magazine, among others.

Fernandes helped develop SmartKlock, a "smart" clock that gave its users only important notifications. For this product, he ran a Kickstarter campaign. Eager to hear more opinions on it, he wrote to Steve Wozniak in September 2014. Wozniak replied with an encouraging note and an autographed photograph of the Apple co-founders sitting with the Apple I prototype. This venture slowly grew into FUNL Corp, which offers an app designed to block out unnecessary notifications, with a reward-based system (working on blockchain). Along with Vadim Fedotov and Gene Hoffman, Fernandes also co-founded Malta-based AET Ventures (AEToken).

Fernandes has advised the country of Barbados, the Government of Goa, and multiple Goan political parties on IT and Education policy. He was a speaker at TEDxPanaji in 2017, keynote speaker at the International Blockchain Congress, and has been a featured speaker at events hosted by the Computer Society of India, Goa Chamber of Commerce and Industry (GCCI), Goa University, BITS Pilani University, Goa Engineering College and 91Springboard.

Blockchain and Cryptocurrency
In November 2017, Fernandes founded blockchain startup FUNL Corp, a platform that “filters notifications using a social blocking approach making real-time intelligent decisions on whether to block or let a notification through to your phone based on data executed from other users”. Later, Fernandes co-founded a blockchain based payment solution for the affiliate marketing industry (built on the Ethereum blockchain as a side chain), called Affiliate Economy Token or AEToken. In October 2018, AEToken won the competition for the best ICO pitch at the Malta Blockchain Summit.

Fernandes often speaks on the subjects of cryptocurrency and blockchain at conferences and seminars. He has spoken at the following events:
 Keynote speaker at a Blockchain seminar at Padre Conceição College of Engineering (PCCE) in 2018.

In December 2018, Fernandes became a biweekly guest on Malta’s BloxliveTV, for his opinion on cryptocurrency. He has since appeared on their "Crypto Now" and the "New On The Block" shows. In March 2019, they profiled Fernandes on their show "Be Influenced", which highlights people in the blockchain industry.

In 2019, Fernandes decided to launch his own channel, TokenJay.TV, which promotes people in the blockchain industry and working in other technologies that promote sustainability.

Awards and accolades
Fernandes has been awarded the Seaside Startup Summit 2018 Award, Startup@Singapore Award, the First National Technopreneurship competition Award (Singapore), "Best Business Plan" award from Sybase at the Global Entrepreneurs Challenge at Stanford University, California, the Childnet International Award (UK) in 1999 and in 2000 he was featured on Rediff.com's "Achiever Track". In 2015, he won the Asian Scientist Writing Prize, for his piece entitled Moore’s Law and Evolution: How non biological evolution made Charles Darwin irrelevant, which focused on how evolution has been far outpaced by non-biological evolution and the age of the cyborg. He also holds a patent for a Network DVR. In 2019, he was awarded the Karmaveer Chakra Award.

References

External links
 
 

Year of birth missing (living people)
Living people
Indian technology writers
Writers from Goa
People associated with cryptocurrency